Kronthaler is a German surname. Notable people with the surname include:

Andreas Kronthaler (sport shooter) (born 1952), Austrian sport shooter
Andreas Kronthaler (fashion designer) (born 1966)
Markus Kronthaler (1967–2006), Austrian gendarme and mountaineer

German-language surnames